The following is the filmography of Takeo Kimura, the Japanese art director, writer, and film director who has art-directed more than 200 films over a span of more than six decades and ranks among Japan's best-known art directors. His training began with the Nikkatsu Company in 1941, whose production division was merged into Daiei during the wartime industry reorganization, where he was promoted to art director in 1945. His debut film as such was Umi no yobu koe (1945). Nikkatsu re-opened its production studio in 1954 and Kimura moved there. He worked with several directors, including top action director Toshio Masuda on films such as Red Quay (1958) with top star Yujiro Ishihara and Gangster VIP (1968) starring Tetsuya Watari. However, his longest and most famous collaboration has been with director Seijun Suzuki, which began with The Bastard (1963). Together they developed a bold, expressive style exemplified in Gate of Flesh (1964) and Tokyo Drifter (1966). Suzuki often rewrote his scripts with Kimura, who was given his first screenwriting credit on The Flower and the Angry Waves (1964). Kimura was also a part of Guryū Hachirō, the pen name of the writing group that formed around Suzuki in the mid-1960s and wrote Branded to Kill (1967).

Kimura left Nikkatsu in 1973 to work freelance. He subsequently art-directed many films for director Kei Kumai over almost 20 years. This included Kumai's best-known film Sandakan No. 8 (1974), Love and Faith (1978) featuring Toshirō Mifune and The Sea Is Watching (2002) based on one of Akira Kurosawa's final scripts. Kimura's collaboration with director Kazuo Kuroki exceeded 20 years, including the Art Theatre Guild film Preparation for the Festival (1975) and The Face of Jizo (2004). He worked with Suzuki on several more films, including Zigeunerweisen (1980) and Pistol Opera (2001), a follow-up to Branded to Kill. Zigeunerweisen was voted best Japanese film of the 1980s by Japanese film critics. He art-directed on Fire Festival and Tampopo (both 1985), career highlights in the respective oeuvres of directors Mitsuo Yanagimachi and Juzo Itami. Kaizō Hayashi's best remembered and debut film To Sleep so as to Dream (1986) marked the beginning of another long collaboration which also encompassed his Maiku Hama trilogy: The Most Terrible Time in My Life (1994), Stairway to the Distant Past (1995) and The Trap (1996).

At age 86 Kimura directed the first of four short films with Mugen Sasurai (2004), which earned him the title for oldest directorial debut. The last was Matouqin Nocturne (2007) in which Suzuki appeared in a prominent role. Kimura then wrote and directed the feature-length film Dreaming Awake (2008) based on his own self-published novel. He was recognized by Guinness World Records for "the oldest debut as a feature film director" at age 90. Suzuki again appeared in the film. Kimura himself acted in a couple small roles for other directors.

Filmography

Art director

Director

Writer

Actor

References
General
 
 
 

Specific

External links
 
 

Director filmographies